The Painkiller Tour was a concert tour by English heavy metal band Judas Priest which was in support of the album Painkiller. It ran from 18 October 1990 until 15 April 1991.

This tour introduced new drummer Scott Travis from Racer X, who joined the band in 1989 after previous drummer Dave Holland's departure that same year. He has remained with the band ever since, surpassing Holland as the band's longest serving drummer.

Pre-tour
A one-off pre-tour show took place on 13 September 1990 in which the band performed at the third annual Foundations Forum in Los Angeles. It was recorded and put together along with the performance from Iron Maiden vocalist Bruce Dickinson's solo band (recorded on 27 June 1990 in London) as a bootlegged split live album. The setlist for the event is as follows:

 "Riding on the Wind"
 "Grinder"
 "Heading Out to the Highway"
 "Between the Hammer and the Anvil"
 "Bloodstone"
 "Better By You, Better Than Me" (Spooky Tooth cover)
 "The Green Manalishi (With the Two Prong Crown)"(Fleetwood Mac cover)
 "Leather Rebel"
 "Hell Bent for Leather"
 "You've Got Another Thing Comin'"

Encore:
 "Living After Midnight"

Note
 The live versions of "Better By You, Better Than Me" and "Leather Rebel" appear as bonus tracks on the 2001 re-issues of Stained Class and Painkiller respectively

Setlist

 "Blood Red Skies" (Intro Only)
 "Hell Bent for Leather"
 "Grinder"
 "The Hellion"
 "Electric Eye"
 "All Guns Blazing"
 "Between The Hammer And The Anvil" (Replaced by "The Sentinel" after 29 October 1990)
 "Metal Gods"
 "Bloodstone" (Dropped after 19 October 1990)
 "Night Crawler"
 "The Ripper"
 "Beyond the Realms of Death"
 "Metal Meltdown" (Replaced by "Riding On The Wind" after 25 October 1990)
 Drum Solo (Added 31 October 1990(?)*)
 "A Touch of Evil" (Removed after 11 February 1991)
 "Victim of Changes"
 "Painkiller"
 "The Green Manalishi (With the Two Prong Crown)" (Fleetwood Mac cover)
 "You've Got Another Thing Comin'"

Encore:

 "Breaking the Law"
 "Living After Midnight"

"Heading Out To The Highway" was also played once.

Tour dates
The band would tour with Megadeth and Testament on the North American leg and with Pantera and Annihilator on the European and UK leg. Exodus and Death Angel were originally billed for the European leg, but were dropped for unknown reasons and replaced by Pantera. They also performed at the second annual Rock in Rio festival with Queensrÿche, Megadeth, Lobão and Sepultura on 23 January 1991.

References

Judas Priest concert tours
1990 concert tours
1991 concert tours